Richard Hodgson (1804, in Wimpole Street, Marylebone, Central London – 4 May 1872, in Chingford, Essex) was an English publisher and amateur astronomer.

Educated at Lewes, Hodgson worked for some years at a banking-house in Lombard Street. In 1834 he joined Boys & Graves to form Hodgson, Boys & Graves. In 1836 he formed with Henry Graves the publishing company Hodgson & Graves. In 1839 their company founded The Art Journal. In 1841 Hodgson retired from publishing to work on daguerrotypy. In the late 1840s he created the Hawkwood estate. After a number of years of achieving considerable success in daguerrotypy, he worked on telescopic and microscopic observations.

According to his obituary in the Monthly Notices of the Royal Astronomical Society:

The geomagnetic storm they observed is now known as the  Carrington Event, which spurred the study of space weather.
Hodgson was made in 1848 a Fellow of the Royal Astronomical Society and in 1849 a Fellow of the Royal Microscopical Society.

See also
Solar storm of 1859

References

1804 births
1872 deaths
Publishers (people) from London
19th-century British astronomers
19th-century English photographers
People educated at Lewes Old Grammar School
People from Marylebone
Fellows of the Royal Microscopical Society
Photographers from Essex
19th-century English businesspeople